Robinson River may refer to
 Robinson River, Northern Territory, a settlement in Australia
 Robinson River (Northern Territory)
 Robinson River (New Zealand)
 Robinson River (Virginia), a river in the United States of America
 Robinson River (Western Australia)